A beer can pyramid, often called a beeramid as a portmanteau, is a pyramid made from discarded beer cans. Beer can pyramids are built as empty beer cans became available, slowly growing as the night (or week or month) wears on. In most cases, though, they are temporary structures, eventually being cleaned up or accidentally knocked over.

On 23 September 2000, the Malaysian Can team, consisting of 12 college students from the INTI College Subang Jaya, Malaysia built a free standing can pyramid created from 9,455 empty aluminium drink cans in 24 minutes at the Mid Valley Megamall in Kuala Lumpur, Malaysia. This feat made a successful entry into the Guinness World Record and to-date this record has yet to be broken.

Another attempt to break the world record Beer Can Pyramid was made with beer cans over 5 metres high and contained 10,660 cans. It was built by the Melbourne University Student Union in 2005, and was featured on Blokesworld and in mX.

A beer can pyramid was shown on the outside of Duff Gardens in The Simpsons episode 9F11 "Selma's Choice", in 1993, as a parody of Cinderella's Castle at Walt Disney World.

References

Pyramids
Figurate numbers
Beer